Lee Byung-kyu (born October 25, 1974) is a South Korean retired baseball player who played 17 seasons for the LG Twins of the KBO League, as well as three seasons with the Chunichi Dragons of Nippon Professional Baseball. He also competed in the 1996 Summer Olympics and in the 2000 Summer Olympics. He played as an outfielder.

Lee was a member of the South Korean team which finished eighth in the 1996 tournament. Four years later he was part of the South Korean baseball team which won the bronze medal.

Lee played for the LG Twins from 1997 to 2006 and then from 2010 to 2016. His number 9 was retired on July 9, 2017, in a ceremony that took place both before and after the game against the Hanwha Eagles.

See also 
 List of KBO career hits leaders

External links 

 profile
 Career statistics and player information from Korea Baseball Organization 

Baseball players at the 2000 Summer Olympics
Baseball players at the 1996 Summer Olympics
Olympic bronze medalists for South Korea
Olympic baseball players of South Korea
Chunichi Dragons players
LG Twins players
South Korean expatriate baseball players in Japan
KBO League Rookie of the Year Award winners
KBO League right fielders
Dankook University alumni
1974 births
Living people
Olympic medalists in baseball
Asian Games medalists in baseball
Baseball players at the 1994 Asian Games
Baseball players at the 1998 Asian Games
Baseball players at the 2002 Asian Games
Baseball players at the 2006 Asian Games
Asian Games gold medalists for South Korea
Asian Games silver medalists for South Korea
Asian Games bronze medalists for South Korea
Medalists at the 1994 Asian Games
Medalists at the 1998 Asian Games
Medalists at the 2002 Asian Games
Medalists at the 2006 Asian Games
Medalists at the 2000 Summer Olympics
People from Gimje
Sportspeople from North Jeolla Province